Matthew Antoine (born April 2, 1985) is an American skeleton racer who has competed since 2003.

Antoine graduated from the California University of Pennsylvania in 2009 with a degree in sports management, wellness and fitness.

Antoine won gold in the mixed team event at the FIBT World Championships 2012 in Lake Placid, New York.  His best World Cup race finish was first at Lake Placid in December 2013.  He ranked third overall in the 2013–14 Skeleton World Cup.

He won the bronze medal at the 2014 Winter Olympics in Sochi, the first U.S. medal in men's skeleton since Jimmy Shea won gold at the 2002 Winter Olympics.

Antoine and John Daly were named to represent the U.S. at the 2018 Winter Olympics in Pyeongchang; he finished 11th.

References

External links
 
 @MattAntoine on Twitter

1985 births
American male skeleton racers
Living people
People from Prairie du Chien, Wisconsin
California University of Pennsylvania alumni
Sportspeople from Wisconsin
Skeleton racers at the 2014 Winter Olympics
Olympic skeleton racers of the United States
Olympic bronze medalists for the United States in skeleton
Medalists at the 2014 Winter Olympics
Skeleton racers at the 2018 Winter Olympics
20th-century American people
21st-century American people